Derrick Wayne Ransom, Jr. (born September 13, 1976) is a former professional American football player who played defensive tackle for seven seasons for the Kansas City Chiefs, the Arizona Cardinals, and the Jacksonville Jaguars.

References

1976 births
Living people
Players of American football from Indianapolis
American football defensive tackles
Cincinnati Bearcats football players
Kansas City Chiefs players
Arizona Cardinals players
Jacksonville Jaguars players